This page shows the results of the Synchronized Swimming Competition at the 1975 Pan American Games, held from October 12 to October 26, 1975 in Mexico City, Mexico. There were three medal events.

Solo

Duet

Team

Medal table

References
 Sports 123

1975 Pan American Games
1975
1975 in synchronized swimming
International aquatics competitions hosted by Mexico